Myawaddy (Phlone ) is a township in southeastern Myanmar, in Kayin State, close to the border with Thailand. Separated from the Thai border town of Mae Sot by the Moei River (Thaungyin River), the town is the most important trading point between Myanmar and Thailand.

History 

On 6 August 2010, a bomb exploded in the car park of a crowded market in Myawaddy, killing two men and seriously injuring four others.

Economy 

Myawaddy is home to one of 7 official border trade posts with Thailand, and opened on 16 september 1998. The border-crossing is a major route for the export of Myanmar's gems, many of which have their provenance changed once across the border. The India–Myanmar–Thailand Trilateral Highway connection to Myawaddy opened in August 2015.

Tourism 
Under the new agreement between Thailand and Myanmar governments, travelers who cross the border from Myawaddy-Mae Sot Friendship bridge are allowed to stay in Mae Sot for seven days. The new agreement has been effective from 1 October 2016.

Crime 
Since the mid-2010s, Myawaddy has been home to unregulated casinos, which remain illegal in Myanmar. In 2021, Myawaddy was home to at least 18 casinos.

The area around Myawaddy has attracted significant investments in the form of Chinese gambling development projects with ties to triads and crime syndicates, including Yatai New City, established by She Zhijiang, a convicted Chinese businessman; Saixigang Industrial Zone, linked to Wan Kuok-koi, a former triad leader; and Huanya International New City. The nearby village of Shwe Kokko has become a major regional crime, human trafficking, and cyber scamming hub. , located in the nearby village of Mawhtotalay, has also emerged as a centre for cyber scams, human trafficking, online gambling, prostitution, and drugs.

Places of interest 
Myawaddy is home to the Migyaunggon or Crocodile Temple, known for its crocodile-shaped library building. The town is also home to the Viewpoint Pagoda and Phra Mon Yoeun, a  Mon-style Buddha image.

Health care 

Myawaddy District Hospital is a public hospital that serves people in Myawaddy township and its surrounding area. Myawaddy Hospital's Operation Theater Building was constructed by the Japanese Government under the Japanese Government's Grant Assistance for Grassroots Human Security Projects (GGP). However, local people still cross the border to seek help at Dr Cynthia Maung's Mae Tao Charity Clinic in Mae Sot for better service.

See also 
 Border Guard Forces

References

External links 
 
 "Myawadi Map — Satellite Images of Myawadi" at Maplandia
 "Myawaddy Photos: Pictures of Myawaddy, Myanmar", TravelPod
 

Township capitals of Myanmar
Populated places in Kayin State
Myanmar–Thailand border crossings